Live It Up, released in 1982, was the first live album released by David Johansen as a solo artist.  Johansen did release a limited and promotional live album, The David Johansen Group Live in 1978, but the album was not officially released until 1993.  Additionally, by the time Live It Up was released, various bootlegs of Johansen's first band, the New York Dolls, were being heavily traded (an official live album would eventually be released in 1984). The impact of the New York Dolls, as both an influential band and as a live act, was becoming a legend in the late-1970s and early-1980s when Johansen was trying to start his solo career. However, his three previous solo albums were not selling as well as expected, therefore, Johansen turned to touring and selling his stage show.

On Live It Up, Johansen performs The Foundations' classic, "Build Me Up Buttercup", the Cadets' "Stranded in the Jungle" (which was also covered by the New York Dolls) and an Animals medley, which included "We Gotta Get Out of This Place", "Don't Bring Me Down" and "It's My Life".

The only New York Dolls original recording he performs is "Personality Crisis". The Johansen/Sylvain compositions “Funky But Chic” and “Frenchette”, which appeared on Johansen’s solo debut, had been performed by the band in its last original phase; the former would later be recorded by the reformed Dolls while Sylvain would release "Frenchette" on his album New York's a Go Go.

Track listing
"We Gotta Get Out of This Place/Don't Bring Me Down/It's My Life" (Barry Mann, Cynthia Weil/Carole King, Gerry Goffin/Roger Atkins, Carl D'Errico) (4:23) 
"Frenchette" (Johansen, Sylvain Sylvain)  (4:53) 
"Reach Out (I'll Be There)" (Holland–Dozier–Holland) (3:24) 
"Is This What I Get for Loving You?" (Carole King, Gerry Goffin, Phil Spector) (3:14) 
"Donna" (Johansen) (4:25) 
"Build Me Up Buttercup" (Mike d'Abo, Tony Macaulay) (2:43) 
"Melody" (Johansen, Ronnie Guy) (3:04) 
"Funky But Chic" (Johansen, Sylvain Sylvain) (3:51) 
"Bohemian Love Pad" (Johansen, Sylvain)  (2:54) 
"Stranded in the Jungle" (Ernestine Smith, James Johnson) (3:56) 
"Personality Crisis" (Johansen, Johnny Thunders) (4:49)

Personnel
David Johansen - vocals
Steven Paul - director
Charlie Giordano - keyboards
Huw Gower - guitar, backing vocals
Tony Machine - drums, percussion
Brett Cartwright - bass, backing vocals
David Nelson - guitar, backing vocals
Technical
Ron Nevison - producer, engineer
Kate Simon, David Gahr - photography

David Johansen albums
Albums produced by Ron Nevison
1982 live albums
Blue Sky Records live albums